Willie Carson (16 July 1926 – 6 October 1996) was a Northern Irish photo-journalist. Born in Derry, his photographs were published throughout the world at the height of The Troubles.

After leaving Longtower School aged 10, Carson worked as a salesman for the local Derry Journal newspaper and then in marketing, before deciding to become a freelance photographer. With the start of the conflict in Northern Ireland, Carson's work, along with many others', became widely viewed around the world, and photographers from all over the world visited and stayed at his home, using his back yard dark room to process their films and his front room to dry their prints.

As well as documenting The Troubles, Carson also continued to capture the Derry life that continued alongside the conflict, and the changes in the town brought by redevelopment. Carson was the author of several books about life in Derry, including Derry Thru The Lens, Yesterday..., A Decade and a Half and So this was Derry. 

In the 1990s Carson was working on another publication bringing his work into the present day, but died before this project was completed. His funeral was attended by John Hume and Martin McGuinness, and Ian Paisley wrote a tribute to him in the Belfast Telegraph following his death in 1996. In 2006, a posthumous collection of his photographic work named after his first book of 1976 - Derry Thru The Lens: Refocus - was published by Guildhall Press, in co-operation with Carson's family.

External links
 Picturing Derry 

1926 births
1996 deaths
Mass media people from Derry (city)
British photojournalists
Photographers from Northern Ireland
Artists from Derry (city)